Erinn Hayes (née Carter; born May 25, 1976) is an American actress and comedian. She is known for her role as Dr. Lola Spratt on the sitcom Childrens Hospital (2008–2016), which she later reprised in its spin-off series Medical Police (2020). For her role, Hayes received a nomination for the Primetime Emmy Award for Outstanding Actress in a Short Form Comedy or Drama Series in 2016.

She has played roles in a number of network sitcoms, including Alison on The Winner (2007), Melanie Clayton on Worst Week (2008–2009), Sheila on Guys with Kids (2012–2013), and Donna Gable on Kevin Can Wait (2016–2017). Her film credits include It's a Disaster (2012), They Came Together (2014), Band Aid (2017), and Bill & Ted Face the Music (2020).

Early life
Erinn Hayes was born in San Fernando, California. She attended the University of Colorado at Boulder and graduated in 1998 with a Bachelor of Fine Arts degree in performance.

Career
In 2005, Hayes appeared as a chef Becky Sharp on Fox's short-lived Kitchen Confidential. Also, in that same year, she played the role of Pam Dawber in the TV movie Behind the Camera: The Unauthorized Story of Mork & Mindy alongside costar Chris Diamantopoulos. Hayes played Alison on the television show The Winner in 2007.

Hayes played the role of Dr. Lola Spratt in the satirical comedy series Childrens Hospital on Adult Swim. She was nominated for an Emmy for Outstanding Actress in a Short Form Comedy or Drama Series in 2016.

Hayes played the role of Melanie Clayton on the CBS comedy series Worst Week. The series was an Americanized version of the British comedy The Worst Week of My Life. She then later starred on the NBC comedy series Guys with Kids. She starred in films such as It's a Disaster, The Watch, and They Came Together. Hayes co-starred in the second season of Hulu's reality TV parody series The Hotwives of Las Vegas in 2015.

In 2015, she performed as an inmate on the band Dengue Fever's video for the song "No Sudden Moves."

In 2016, Hayes began co-starring in the CBS series Kevin Can Wait, portraying the role of Kevin Gable's wife Donna. Following its renewal after the first season, Hayes was fired from the series for unspecified creative reasons. The series was canceled after its second season.

In April 2019, she played the role of Vivian in the Netflix series Huge in France, co-starring with Gad Elmaleh.

In January 2020, Hayes played the role of Lola Spratt in the series Medical Police, with co-star Rob Huebel, for distribution on Netflix. That same year, she starred as Princess Elizabeth Logan, Ted's wife, in Bill and Ted Face the Music, the third installment in the Bill & Ted film series.

On February 18, 2022, it was announced that Hayes will play Ralphie's wife, Sandy Parker, in A Christmas Story Christmas, a sequel to the 1983 film A Christmas Story, for Warner Bros. Pictures and HBO Max.

Personal life
In 2004, Hayes married her high school sweetheart Jack Hayes, a construction supervisor. They have two daughters.

Filmography

Film

Television

References

External links 
 

1976 births
21st-century American actresses
21st-century American comedians
People from the San Fernando Valley
American film actresses
American television actresses
American women comedians
Living people
University of Colorado Boulder alumni